Tomahawk is a rural locality in the local government area (LGA) of Dorset in the North-east LGA region of Tasmania. The 2016 census recorded a population of 48 for the state suburb of Tomahawk.

The town has a caravan park with a small shop. There is a boat ramp and the area is known for its fishing.

History 
Tomahawk was gazetted as a locality in 1965. Previous names were “Portland” (from 1845) and “Du Cane” (after Governor Charles Du Cane, until 1934)

Geography
The waters of Ringarooma Bay, an inlet of Bass Strait, form most of the northern boundary. The Tomahawk River forms the south-western boundary before flowing through to the north.

Road infrastructure 
Route B82 (Waterhouse Road) passes through from west to east. Route C836 (Tomahawk Road) starts at an intersection with B82 and runs north-west to the village, where it ends. Route C840 (Banca Road) starts at an intersection with B82 and runs south until it exits.

References

Towns in Tasmania
North East Tasmania
Localities of Dorset Council (Australia)